The Legend of Love (牛郎織女)  is a 20 episode drama by TVB, filmed in 2002 and released overseas in June 2003. It was re-aired in 2004 on BTV, and in 2005 and 2007 on TVB channels. It is an adaptation of the story of The Cowherd and the Weaver Girl, with slight changes to the storyline.

Cast 

 Deric Wan as Wong Ah Ngau
 Sonija Kwok as Fu Tik Tik
 Stephen Au as Bei Goin
 Leila Tong as Bo Hei Jurk
 Liu Kai Chi as Wong Ah Ma
 Rain Lau as Cheung Yuk Fung
 Wilson Tsui as Ling Long
 Lau Kong as Gong Keurn
 Lily Leung as Wong Mo
 Angela Tong as Gong Ning
 Peter Lai as Ling Bak Sun
 Helena Law
 Vin Choi
 June Chan

External links 

 The Legend of Love on Douban

Hong Kong television soap operas
TVB dramas
2007 Hong Kong television series debuts
2007 Hong Kong television series endings
Romantic fantasy television series